Novius may refer to:

Decimus Junius Novius Priscus, consul of the Roman Empire in 78
Quintus Novius, Roman dramatist of the first century BCE
Tiberius Claudius Novius, leading statesman of Athens 41-61
River Nith, in Scotland; Novius in Latin sources
Novius (beetle), a genus of Australian ladybugs